Jonathan Patrick Moore, previously known as Jonathan Wood, is an Australian actor who has appeared in theatre, film and television.

Early life
Wood was born in Australia in 1982. His mother, Patricia Moore, was killed in a car accident in Adelaide, before his 10th birthday. He graduated from the Adelaide Centre for Performing Arts in 2004.

Career
Wood's first acting role was a guest role on McLeod's Daughters in 2005. He made his breakthrough when he won a role on the Australian television soap opera Neighbours. Wood portrayed Angus Henderson, a man who has an inappropriate relationship with Rachel Kinski (played by Caitlin Stasey). After leaving Neighbours in 2008, Wood began to secure film roles including a role in The Directors Cut which was nominated as Best Drama at the West Australian Screen Awards.

Upon moving to the United States, Wood was told by his agent that the Screen Actors Guild needed him to change his name because they already had a Jonathan Wood in the union. He had a supporting role in the television film William and Kate. Wood continued his television roles in All Saints during 2009.

In 2012, Moore was a series regular on the Canadian and American drama series The L.A. Complex. The show premiered on CTV Television Network in Canada before moving to MuchMusic. In the U.S., the show aired on The CW network. The show lasted two seasons, totalling 19 episodes.

In 2016, Moore was cast in a recurring role in the second season of NBC's Blindspot. The show was created by Martin Gero, who also created The L.A. Complex. Moore plays Oliver Kind, a water conservation specialist who befriends the protagonist, Jane Doe, played by Jaimie Alexander. He also appeared as Ben Morton in New LIfe.

Filmography

Film

Television

References

External links

Story Behind No Hero by Jonathan Wood - Online Essay at Upcoming4.me

Australian male soap opera actors
Australian male film actors
Living people
1982 births